Narceine is an opium alkaloid produced by the Papaver somniferum (opium poppy) plant. It is a bitter, crystalline compound with narcotic effects.  It was formerly used as a substitute for morphine. Its name is derived from the Greek  (nárkē), meaning numbness, and the postfix -ine referring to an alkaloid.

See also
Noscapine, a related alkaloid

References

Natural opium alkaloids
Salicylyl ethers
Piceol ethers
Benzodioxoles
Phenethylamines
Pyrogallol ethers